Ron Bartlett is a sound mixer who was nominated at the 85th Academy Awards for the film Life of Pi. He was nominated in the category of Best Sound Mixing, he shared his nomination with Doug Hemphill and Drew Kunin. He was nominated again in the same category at the 90th Academy Awards for his work in Blade Runner 2049, along with Doug Hemphill and Mac Ruth.

Bartlett won an Academy Award in the category Best Sound for the film Dune. He has produced sound on over 150 films since 1985.

References

External links
 

Living people
Year of birth missing (living people)
Best Sound Mixing Academy Award winners